Boris Zubov (born 1 December 1942) is a Russian sprinter. He competed in the men's 200 metres at the 1964 Summer Olympics.

References

External links
 

1942 births
Living people
Athletes (track and field) at the 1964 Summer Olympics
Russian male sprinters
Olympic athletes of the Soviet Union
Soviet male sprinters
Universiade medalists in athletics (track and field)
Universiade silver medalists for the Soviet Union